The Grumblethorpe Tenant House, also known as the Tenant House of Wister's Big House, is an historic home which is located in the Wister neighborhood of Philadelphia, Pennsylvania. 

Added to the National Register of Historic Places in 1972, it is a contributing property of the Colonial Germantown Historic District, which has been designated as a National Historic Landmark.

History and architectural features
Built sometime around 1744, this structure was expanded during the early nineteenth century. Now a two-and-one-half-story, thirty-one-square-foot stone dwelling, the original house was a one-story structure that was nineteen feet wide by twety-eight feet deep that was created as a dependency to John Wister's summer home, Grumblethorpe.

A contributing property of the Colonial Germantown Historic District, which has been designated as a National Historic Landmark, the Grumblethorpe Tenant House was added to the National Register of Historic Places in 1972.

References

Houses on the National Register of Historic Places in Philadelphia
Houses completed in 1744
Wister, Philadelphia
1744 establishments in the Thirteen Colonies